Cedarton is a rural locality in the Moreton Bay Region, Queensland, Australia.

Geography 
The Stanley River forms the southern and part of the eastern boundary of Cedarton. Kilcoy–Beerwah Road runs through from south-west to north-east.

History 

References

Suburbs of Moreton Bay Region
Localities in Queensland